Vic Tablian (Varoujan Aintablian, born 10 October 1937) is an Armenian-British actor, known for the Indiana Jones movie Raiders of the Lost Ark in 1981, in which he played both the treacherous Peruvian guide and later in the film as the Nazi collaborating "Monkey Man".

Biography

Vic Tablian was born in Jerusalem. He is the son of Armenian genocide survivors.

In 1948, he moved to Cyprus. In 1962, he relocated to the United Kingdom.

In 1992, Tablian returned to the Indiana Jones franchise, playing Demetrios in the first episode of "The Young Indiana Jones Chronicles". He also played in Midnight Express (1978), Navy Seals (1990), Sphinx (1981), Eleni (1985) and The Bill (2007).
The Promise (2016) dedicated to the Armenian Genocide was the last movie he played in. His role in "The Promise" was the Cattle Car Old Man.

Filmography

References

External links 
 

1937 births
Living people
Ethnic Armenian male actors
Soviet emigrants to the United Kingdom
British male film actors
British male television actors